Monika Herzig (born 1964) is a German-born jazz pianist.

After receiving a scholarship in 1987 from the pedagogical institute in Weingarten, Germany for a one-year exchange program at the University of Alabama, she moved to the United States in August 1988. Later, she completed her Doctorate in Music Education with a minor in Jazz Studies at Indiana University, where she is a faculty member in Arts Administration.

She recorded with the jazz fusion group BeebleBrox and has produced four albums as leader of the Monika Herzig Acoustic Project. Peace on Earth was released locally in Indianapolis in 2008 and was released nationally in 2009 on the Owl Studios label.

Awards and honors
 1994 Best Original Composition,  "Let's Fool One" Down Beat
 1994–1996 Two times finalist with BeebleBrox, winner with Oliver Nelson Jr., WTPI Winter Jazzfest Competition, Indianapolis
 2000, 2003, 2005 Individual Artist Grant recipient, Indiana Arts Commission
 2015 Jazz Journalist Association Hero

Discography
 Melody without Words (Acme, 2000)
 Melody with Harmony (Acme, 2003)
 In Your Own Sweet Voice (Owl, 2005)
 What Have You Gone and Done? (Owl, 2007)
 Peace on Earth, (Owl, 2009)
 Come with Me (Owl, 2011)
 Whole World in Her Hands (Whaling City Sound, 2016)
 Sheroes (Whaling City Sound, 2018) 
Eternal Dance (Savant, 2020)

References

External links

1964 births
Living people
German jazz pianists
German women pianists
Indiana University faculty
German composers
Owl Studios artists
Indiana University alumni
University of Alabama alumni
Place of birth missing (living people)
21st-century pianists
21st-century women pianists